In electronics, TO-8  is a designation for a standardized metal semiconductor package. TO in TO-8 stands for "transistor outline" and refers to a series of technical drawings produced by JEDEC. The TO-8 package is noticeably larger than the more common TO-5 package. While originally designed for medium power transistors (that is, higher power than TO-5 but lower than TO-3) such as the 2N1483 series or the AD136, it is more commonly used for integrated circuits and sensors (see Variants below).

Construction

The lead diameter is nominally .

Variants

Several variants of the original TO-8 package have the same cap dimensions but differ in the number and length of the leads (wires). Somewhat incorrectly, TO-8 is often used in manufacturer's literature as a synonym for any package with the cap dimensions of TO-8, regardless of the number of leads, or even for any package with the diameter of TO-8, regardless of the cap height and the number of leads. Light-sensitive or light-emitting devices have a transparent window, lens, or parabolic reflectors in the top of the case rather than a sealed, flat top. There are variants with between 2 and 16 leads.

National standards
TO-233 is intended to replace previous definitions of TO-8.

References

Semiconductor packages